is a private university in the town of Sangō in Nara Prefecture, Japan, established in 1984 as Nara Sangyo University (奈良産業大学). In 2014, the University has adopted the new name as Nara Gakuen University.

References

External links
 Official website 

Educational institutions established in 1886
Private universities and colleges in Japan
Universities and colleges in Nara Prefecture
1886 establishments in Japan